The Jiloca is a river in Aragón, Spain, a tributary of the river Jalón, and part of the watershed of the Ebro basin. The course of the river runs through the provinces of Teruel and Zaragoza. The river flows in a generally north easterly direction from its source near Monreal del Campo.

The valley was an historic route between the Meseta Central and the Mediterranean coast. Roman bridges remain in many pueblos and remains of watermills can be seen. The water is generally of good quality and supports a range of wildlife. Cleaning works by the regional government have been criticised by environmental organisations who claim that the ecology has been damaged.

Course
The source is disputed, tradition holds that it rises at an artesian well, the Fuente de Cella, at the base of the Sierra Albarracín in Teruel province. The well is surrounded by an elliptical parapet wall built by the Italian engineer Domingo Ferrari. It is now thought that the stretch of river between Cella and Monreal del Campo is the remains of an 18th-century canal which was cut to drain the Laguna Cañizar at Villarquemado. It is currently accepted that the Jiloca raises at the Ojos (Eyes) of Monreal,  from the town. These are a series of ponds linked by channels. From this point there is an irrigation channel which waters a small valley near Daroca.

The river flows on from Daroca in a north easterly direction, past Manchones, Morero, Montón, Morata de Jiloca, Maruenda and Paracuellos de Jiloca until it joins the Jalón between Carramolina and  Calatayud.

Towns named after the river are Morata de Jiloca, Paracuellos de Jiloca, Fuentes de Jiloca, Torremocha de Jiloca, Velilla de Jiloca and Villanueva de Jiloca.

Hydrographics

Natural history

The Ojos de Monreal are a series of artesian wells which form pools connected by small channels. This area is rich in wildlife, including waterfowl, grebes, wrens, kingfishers, owls, orioles and woodpeckers. Thickets of poplar, willow and walnut trees give plenty of shelter. The water is considered in very good condition according to the assessment of the Plan Hidrológico de la Cuenca del Ebro (Hydrological Plan of the Ebro).

Further downstream in the valley between Manchones and Morero, birdlife includes goshawks, eagles, orioles, robins, finches, hoopoe and kestrels.  Deer and bobcats are found in the Sierra Santa Cruz which borders the river, hedgehogs and shrews are to be found near the banks. Trees include poplars, elm, and ash.

In 2000, the Asociación Naturalista de Aragón strongly condemned cleaning works by the regional government, which they said were systematically destroying riparian vegetation, killing fish and upsetting the ecology of the river in the reaches between Daroca and Calatayud.  In November 2009, an investigation into soil erosion in the Jiloca basin was announced, with the intention of determining suitable future land use strategies.

History
In the past many water-mills were powered by the river, but now only ruins of these remain.  The valley of the Jiloca is an ancient route between the Meseta Central, the Ebro and the coast of the Levante. Many Roman bridges remain in the pueblos of the valley.

Tributary

See also 
 List of rivers of Spain
Ribera del Jiloca
Jiloca Comarca

References

Ebro basin
Province of Teruel
Province of Zaragoza
Rivers of Aragon
Rivers of Spain